Holyhead Admiralty Pier railway station served the pier in the town of Holyhead, Anglesey, Wales, from 1851 to 1925 on the Chester and Holyhead Railway.

History 
The station was opened on 20 May 1851 by the Chester and Holyhead Railway. The services were horse-drawn until 1860. The goods shed was used by passengers to board the ferry to Ireland. They stopped using this in 1880 when the line was extended to Holyhead. The station closed on 1 April 1925.

References 

Disused railway stations in Anglesey
Railway stations in Great Britain opened in 1851
Railway stations in Great Britain closed in 1925
1851 establishments in Wales
1925 disestablishments in Wales